DYM, or Dymeclin, is a protein that in humans is encoded by the DYM gene.

Dym or DYM may also refer to:

 Dym equation, the third-order partial differential equation in the theory of solitons
 ISO 639:dym or Yanda Dogon, a language spoken in Mali

People with the surname
 Anna Dym, better known as Broadway Rose, an American panhandler who gained notoriety in the 1940s
 Clive Dym (1942–2016), American professor emeritus of Engineering Design
 Harry Dym (born 1938), Israeli mathematics professor

See also
 
 Dim (disambiguation)